Émilie Gex-Fabry (born 21 May 1986) is a Swiss ski mountaineer.

Gex-Fabry was born in Vevey. She started ski mountaineering in 1991, and competed first in the 2000 Trophée des Gastlosen event. She has been member of the Swiss team since 2003, and lives in Val-d'Illiez. After several good results in younger age classes, she placed 10th in the "seniors" single race of the 2007 European Championship. She won the Patrouille des Glaciers in 2010 with a time of 7h41, the course record for female teams as of 2018. After 5 years study at the university of Fribourg, she works as biologist/botanist.

Selected results 
 2003:
 3rd (cadets), Trophée des Gastlosen
 2004:
 1st, World Championship "cadets" single race
 1st, European Cup Trilogiski "cadets" single race
 1st (juniors filles), Trophée des Gastlosen
 2005:
 2nd, European Championship "juniors" single race
 3rd, European Championship "juniors" vertical race
 1st, European Championship relay young
 2006:
 1st (juniors), Trophée des Gastlosen
 3rd, World Championship "juniors" vertical race
 2007:
 3rd, European Championship "espoir" single race
 2008:
 2nd, World Championship "espoirs" vertical race
 2nd, World Championship "espoirs" long-distance race
 2nd, World Cup race Valerette Altiski
 3rd, World Championship "espoirs" single race
 2009:
 3rd, European Championship "espoirs" single race
 3rd, European Championship "espoirs" vertical race
 4th, World Cup race Tour du Rutor with Gabrielle Magnenat
 2010:
 5th, World Cup race Etna
 1st, Patrouille des Glaciers, new record
 2011:
 4th, World Championship team race (together with Mireille Richard)
 4th, World Championship vertical, total ranking
 6th, World Championship single race
 6th, World Championship vertical race
 8th, World Championship sprint
 2012:
 1st, European Championship relay, together with  Séverine Pont-Combe and Mireille Richard
 3rd, European Championship team, together with Maude Mathys
 5th, European Championship single
 6th, World Championship vertical, combined ranking
 3rd, World Cup race in Etna, vertical race
 4th, World Cup race in Etna, single race
 3rd, World Cup race in Tromso, sprint race
 4th, World Cup race in Tromso, single race
 5th, World Cup overall
 2013:
 3rd, World Championship team, together with Maude Mathys
 3rd, World Championship relay, with Maude Mathys and Mireille Richard
 3rd, World Cup race in Les Marécottes, sprint race
 3rd, World Cup race in Clusone, sprint race
 2nd, World Cup race in Tromso, sprint race
 4th, World Cup race in Tromso, single race
 3rd, World Cup sprint race
 6th, World Cup overall

Patrouille des Glaciers 

 2006: 1st on the track Arolla-Verbier, together with Coraly Pernet and Daniela Sigrist
 2008: 1st on the track Arolla-Verbier, together with Mireille Richard and Mireia Miro
 2010: 1st, together with Nathalie Etzensperger and Marie Troillet

Trofeo Mezzalama 

 2011: 4th, together with Gabrielle Magnenat and Corinne Favre

Pierra Menta 

 2013: 3rd, together with Maude Mathys
 2014: 2nd, together with Axelle Mollaret

External links 
 Emilie Gex-Fabry at Skimountaineering.org

References 

1986 births
Living people
People from Vevey
Swiss female ski mountaineers
Sportspeople from the canton of Vaud